The German Geophysical Society (DGG) is a society for geophysics in Germany; it was founded on 19 Sep 1922 in Leipzig, Germany on the initiative of the seismologist Emil Wiechert, as the Deutsche Seismologische Gesellschaft (German Seismological Society).
Among its founding members were also Karl Erich Andrée, Beno Gutenberg, Franz Kossmat, and August Heinrich Sieberg.
In 1924, it changed its name into German Geophysical Society.

Its main activities include the organization of an annual scientific conference of geophysicists mostly of German-speaking countries (or close personal or professional ties to them) and the publication of a major scientific journal, the Geophysical Journal International (GJI) in cooperation with the Royal Astronomical Society. The DGG also organizes seminars and workshops on specific scientific topics for its members and offers information and advice on issues related to the organization of university curricula in geophysics.

Most members are professional geophysicists; however, everybody who supports the aims of the society can become a member. Membership is terminated by resignation at the end of the calendar, in justified cases, members can be voted out by the board.

External links
The DGG website (German)

Geophysics societies
Scientific organisations based in Germany
Scientific organizations established in 1922
1922 establishments in Germany
Organisations based in Leipzig
Scientific societies based in Germany
Earth sciences organizations